Enter TV was a Serbian television channel with regional frequency.

Created on the ashes of the defunct YU Info channel, it started broadcasting during spring 2007.

Television stations in Serbia
Television channels and stations established in 2007